Powermat Technologies Ltd. is a developer of wireless power solutions for consumers, OEM and public places. The company licenses IP, sells charging spots to public venues and the software to support their maintenance, management and consumer interaction. 
The company's inductive charging technology has been adopted by the Power Matters Alliance (PMA) and is the platform adopted by Duracell, General Motors, Starbucks and AT&T.

Products
Powermat products include both receivers (Rx) and Transmitters (Tx) for the mobile industry, consumers and public venues. It licenses its technology, which enables compliance with the AirFuel (formally PMA) and the Qi standard. Has a software service system to allow venue owners to control and manage the wireless power network they had installed. It consists of charging spots and a gateway.

Technology

The company's technology is based upon Inductively Coupled Power Transfer. As the block diagram shows, within a Transmitter (Tx) - by varying the current in the primary induction coil - an alternating magnetic field is generated from within a charging spot. The receiver (Rx) is a second induction coil in the handheld device that takes power from the magnetic field and converts it back into electric current to charge the device battery. 
An additional part of the technology is the System Control Communication:
Data over Coil (DoC) – the Rx sends feedback to Tx by changing the load seen by the Tx coil. The protocol is frequency based signalling, thus enables fast response of the transmitter. Each receiver is equipped with a unique ID (RxID), enabling the system, when installed in public venues, to recognize users and communicate with them. The RxID is communicated as part of the data over coil to the Tx.

History
The company was founded in 2006 by Ran Poliakine. Its first products were launched in 2009. In 2011 General Motors announced that it would integrate Powermat's wireless charging technology into certain vehicles in its 2013 Chevrolet Volt line, and would also invest in the private company. During that year Powermat also partnered with Leyden Energy, manufacturer of advanced lithium-imide (Li-imide) batteries, in order to develop wireless chargeable batteries, as well as with Arconas, provider of public seating, to incorporate wireless charging directly into airport seating and lounge areas. The first integration with airports included: Chicago O'Hare International Airport, Aspen–Pitkin Airport, Eppley Airfield in Omaha and Toronto Pearson International Airport. Powermat and Procter & Gamble created a joint venture, under the Duracell Powermat brand. The venture began operations in January 2012. The entertainer Jay-Z signed on as the "face and voice" of the venture, and took an equity stake in the company. As part of a partnership with Madison Square Garden, the arena features Duracell Powermat charging surfaces in a number of  suites and other areas, beginning in mid-2012, in addition the Duracell Powermat charging spots were embedded in Jay-Z's 40/40 Club NYC club tables. A year later, Powermat Technologies along with Procter & Gamble founded the Power Matters Alliance (PMA), an alliance of semiconductor and consumer electronics industries as well as governmental organizations. The alliance dedication is to advance smart and environmental wireless power. AT&T and Starbucks are board members and among its members are: Samsung, LG, HTC, BlackBerry, Huawei, ZTE, Texas Instruments, STMicroelectronics, Broadcom, Fairchild Semiconductor, Freescale, IDT, Otterbox, Incipio and Skech.

In October 2012, Powermat and Starbucks announced a pilot program to install Powermat charging surfaces in the table tops in 17 locations around Boston area. The technology is consistent with Starbucks' environment friendly guidelines. As the pilot was completed, in July 2013, Starbucks decided to bring the Powermat's wireless charging tech to additional locations in the Silicon Valley. Powermat announced it had acquired Powerkiss, a provider of integrated wireless charging solutions. Powerkiss had deployed wireless charging hot spots across Europe, founded in 2008 and headquartered in Helsinki, Finland. In November 2013 the company announced a deployment at some Coffee Bean and Tea Leaf locations. Additional Powermat systems are installed at McDonald's restaurants in New York City and in select locations in Europe. In January 2014, the company, together with Flextronics, agreed to cooperate in order to embed wireless power in electronic mobile devices.
In March 2015, Samsung included wireless charging embedded in the Galaxy S6 series. In June 2015, Powermat together with Dupont launched a Dupont Corian charging surface bringing innovation into the surfacing solutions world.
In January 2016, Powermat rolled out and installed at 150 Starbucks Chicago stores.
In December 2016, Elad Dubzinski was appointed Company Chief Executive Officer.

In September 2017, Apple held its annual Keynote event, and announced that the new iPhone line-up (iPhone 8, iPhone 8 Plus and iPhone X) will have inductive wireless charging (Qi standard). This announcement had a significant effect on the wireless charging market, and Powermat was quick to announce that all existing Charging Spots will be compatible with Qi in order to support the iPhone users.
A few months later, during the Consumer Electronic Show (CES) which took place in early January, Powermat announced joining the Wireless Power Consortium, developer of the Qi standard  and announced the groundbreaking SmartInductive technology.
During September 2018, Powermat HQ moved to a new office in the city of Petah Tikva, Israel.

References

Wireless energy transfer
Consumer electronics brands
Privately held companies of Israel
Electronics companies of Israel
Israeli companies established in 2006
Wireless
Wireless transmitters
Israeli brands
Electronics companies established in 2006